Kenneth Paul Hancock (born 25 November 1937) is an English former football goalkeeper. He is the younger brother of Ray Hancock.

He made 442 league appearances in a 15-year career in the Football League. He began his professional career at Port Vale in December 1958. He helped the club to win the Fourth Division title in 1958–59, and remained the club's first choice goalkeeper until he was sold on to Ipswich Town for a £10,000 fee in December 1964. He kept goal as the club won the Second Division title in 1967–68. He was sold on to Tottenham Hotspur for £7,000 in March 1969. He moved on to Bury in July 1971, and later played Northern Premier League football for Stafford Rangers and Northwich Victoria. He later briefly managed non-league Leek Town.

Playing career
Hancock played for Stoke City, before joining local rivals Port Vale as an amateur in November 1958; he signed as a professional with the "Valiants" the next month. He made his debut in a 4–2 defeat by Millwall at The Den on 13 December. He played the remaining 24 games of the 1958–59 season, as manager Norman Low took the club to the Fourth Division title. Hancock lost his first team place in November 1959 due to injury, but managed to regain it off reserve goalkeeper John Poole by April 1960. The pair each played 23 Third Division games in the 1959–60 season. Hancock went on to keep goal 47 times in the 1960–61 campaign, fending off competition from both Poole and John Cooke. He was an ever-present during the 51 game 1962–63 season, as Vale finished one place and four points shy of the promotion places under new boss Freddie Steele. Hancock played 50 games in the 1963–64 campaign, with Cooke deputising on two occasions. He made 22 appearances in the 1963–64 season, but faced pressure from new signing Reg Davies.

Hancock was sold to Bill McGarry's Ipswich Town for a £10,000 fee in December 1964. He made 20 Second Division appearances in the 1964–65 season. He played 48 games for the "Blues" in 1965–66 and 1966–67. He featured 45 times in 1967–68, as the Portman Road club won the Second Division title. He played 18 First Division games in 1968–69, before new manager Bobby Robson sold him on to league rivals Tottenham Hotspur for £7,000 in March 1969. Hancock played just six league and cup games for Bill Nicholson's "Spurs" in 1969–70 and 1970–71. He worked as Pat Jennings's deputy whilst Barry Daines was still learning the game. He left White Hart Lane and moved on to Bury in July 1971. He played 35 Fourth Division games for the "Shakers" in 1971–72 and 1972–73 under the stewardship of Allan Brown and then Tom McAnearney. He then left Gigg Lane and later played Northern Premier League football for Stafford Rangers and Northwich Victoria.

Coaching career
After retiring as a player he returned to Port Vale in July 1975 as a part-time coach under the management of Roy Sproson. He moved on to Cheshire County League side Leek Town as a manager in 1978, later serving as club chairman. He also sat on the Leek and Moorland League management committee. He co-founded Port Vale's Ex-Players Association with former teammate John Poole.

Style of play
Former teammate Roy Sproson described him as: "strong in dealing with crosses, quick reactions and a fine kicker of the ball". He went on to describe a save in an FA Cup tie with Sunderland as one where "[he] turned in mid-air and managed to push the ball round the post in what still rates as the most fantastic save I have seen to this day."

He also had the ability to drop-kick the ball into the opposition penalty area.

Career statistics
Source:

Honours
Port Vale
Football League Fourth Division: 1958–59

Ipswich Town
Football League Second Division: 1967–68

References

1937 births
Living people
Footballers from Stoke-on-Trent
English footballers
Association football goalkeepers
Stoke City F.C. players
Port Vale F.C. players
Ipswich Town F.C. players
Tottenham Hotspur F.C. players
Bury F.C. players
Stafford Rangers F.C. players
Northwich Victoria F.C. players
English Football League players
Northern Premier League players
Association football coaches
English football managers
Leek Town F.C. managers
English football chairmen and investors